Janet Susan McCalman,  (born 5 December 1948) is an Australian social historian, population researcher and author at the Melbourne School of Population and Global Health, University of Melbourne. McCalman won the Ernest Scott Prize in 1984 and 2022 (shared); the second woman to have won and one of eight historians to have won the prize twice.

Early life and education
McCalman was born in Richmond, Victoria, the daughter of industrial officer Laurie Brian McCalman and Hélène Ulrich. Her parents were members of the Communist Party of Australia. She won a scholarship to Methodist Ladies' College, Kew. At school, McCalman was head of the debate team and on the choir and yearbook committees. McCalman wrote polemics for the school yearbook in her final year (1966). One was in support of A. A. Phillips saying, 'We can only despair at the complacency of our politicians, for Australia does not educate her "democracy" and is severely inhibiting the flowering of her elite.' In another McCalman said, 'We are poised on the edge of our age of abundance, which through automation could free the human spirit from the shackles of material necessity and solve the problems of world poverty and illiteracy, yet the system is preparing us for subordination, selfishness, irrationality and meaninglessness.'

McCalman received a Bachelor of Arts with Honours from the University of Melbourne in 1970 and a Doctor of Philosophy in 1976 from the Australian National University for her thesis, "Respectability and Working-Class Radicalism in Victorian London: 1850–1890: A Contribution to the Debate". She did not commence a full-time professional academic career until 1993, when she took up a Fellowship at Melbourne University. McCalman became Reader in History in 2000 and then Head of the History and Philosophy department in 2001.

Career
McCalman returned to the University of Melbourne in 1993 on a four-year Australian Research Council Fellowship. Since then she has fulfilled many roles within that university. Firstly she became a Senior Lecturer in the Centre for Health and Society. In 2000 she was appointed Reader in the History and Philosophy of Science at the same centre. She was appointed Professor in Public Health in 2003. Her work since 2011 has been at the Centre for Health and Society, in the Melbourne School of Population and Global Health.

McCalman gave the third Sir John Quick Bendigo Lecture in 1996. She spoke on "Towns and Gowns : The Humanities and the Community". La Trobe University established this annual lecture in recognition of Quick's work towards Federation and election as Bendigo's first Federal Member of Parliament.
 
Frank Moorhouse, in his 2004 Griffith Review essay, "Welcome back Bakunin – Life chances in Australia: some notes of discomfort", referred to McCalman's 1993 book, Journeyings as "classic study of privilege". By analysing the individuals in the Australian Who's Who 1998, McCalman showed that private schools dominated, that the "old boys club" prevailed.

Personal life

McCalman received her PhD at ANU in 1976 and married the publisher Al Knight (1924-2013) on 15 December 1978, with whom she had two children: Nicholas (1981) and Imogen (1985). Knight's first book at Hyland House was Wendy Lowenstein's significant work of social history, Weevils in the Flour.

Honours and recognition
 Fellow of the Australian Academy of the Humanities, 1993
 Walkley Awards for Journalism, short-listed for Editorial and Opinion category,  1997
 Media Award from the College of Educational Administration (Vic), for outstanding contribution to public discourse on education, 1999
 Centenary Medal, 2001, "for service to Australian society and the humanities in the study of the history of health"
 Fellow of the Academy of the Social Sciences in Australia, 2005
 Appointed honorary doctor by Umeå University, Sweden, 2015
 Awarded title, Redmond Barry Distinguished Professor, University of Melbourne, 2016.
 Companion of the Order of Australia (AC), 2018 Australia Day Honours, "for eminent service to education, particularly in the field of social history, as a leading academic, researcher and author, as a contributor to multi-disciplinary curriculum development, and through the promotion of history to the wider community."

Publications

Books
 Struggletown: Public and Private Life in Richmond 1900–1965, Melbourne University Press, 1984, ; 2nd ed., Hyland House, 1998, 
  A hundred years at Bank Street: Ascot Vale State School, 1885–1985, with research by Janet Kershaw et al., Ascot Vale State School, 1985, 
 Who Went Where in Who's Who 1988: The Schooling of the Australian Elite, co-authored with Mark Peel, History Department, University of Melbourne, 1992, 
 The 1990 Journeyings survey: a statistical portrait of a middle-class generation, co-authored with Mark Peel, History Department, University of Melbourne, 1993, 
 Journeyings: The Biography of a Middle-Class Generation 1920–1990, Melbourne University Press, 1993, 
 Solid Bluestone Foundations and Rising Damp : The Fortunes of the Melbourne Middle Class, 1890–1990, History Department, University of Melbourne, 1994, 
 Sex and Suffering: Women's Health and a Women's Hospital, the Royal Women's Hospital, Melbourne 1856–1996, Melbourne University Press, 1998, ; Johns Hopkins University Press, 1999, 
 On the World of the Sixty-Nine Tram, Melbourne University Publishing, 2006, 
 Vandemonians: The Repressed History of Colonial Victoria, Melbourne University Publishing, 2021,

Chapters contributed
 "The originality of ordinary lives", in Creating Australia : Changing Australian History, edited by Wayne Hudson & Geoffrey Bolton, Allen & Unwin, 1997, 
 "Well-being in Australian Children", in No Time to Lose : The Wellbeing of Australia's Children, edited by Sue Richardson and Margot Prior, Melbourne University Publishing, 2005, 
 "Blurred Visions", in Why Universities Matter : A Conversation About Values, Means and Directions, edited by Tony Coady. Allen & Unwin, 2000,

Literary awards

References

1948 births
20th-century Australian historians
20th-century Australian women writers
21st-century Australian historians
21st-century Australian women writers
Australian National University alumni
Australian women historians
Companions of the Order of Australia
Fellows of the Academy of the Social Sciences in Australia
Fellows of the Australian Academy of the Humanities
Living people
People educated at Methodist Ladies' College, Melbourne
Recipients of the Centenary Medal
Academic staff of the University of Melbourne
University of Melbourne women
Historians of Australia